Rudabad may refer to:
 Rudabad, Gilan
 Rudabad, Isfahan